Jonathan Smallwood (born 1975) is a Professor in the Department of Psychology at Queen's University at Kingston in Ontario, Canada. His research uses the tools of cognitive neuroscience to investigate the process by which the brain self generates thoughts not arising from perception, such as during the experience of mind-wandering and daydreaming. For the last two years he has been recognised as one of the world's most highly cited scientists.

Biography

Education
The grandson of Joey Smallwood's cousin, Jonathan "Jonny" Smallwood earned his BA (1996) and PhD (2002) from The University of Strathclyde in Glasgow, Scotland. He was a lecturer in psychology at Glasgow Caledonian University (2002–2004) before traveling to the University of British Columbia as a post-doctoral researcher (2004–2006). From 2006 to 2008 he was a lecturer in psychology at the University of Aberdeen, after which Smallwood returned to North America to work with Jonathan Schooler as an assistant project scientist at the University of California, Santa Barbara. From 2011 to 2013 he was a senior researcher at the Max Planck Institute for Human Cognitive and Brain Sciences in the Department of Social Neuroscience. In August 2013 he joined the psychology department psychology at the University of York and in August 2018, he was promoted to professor. Since July 2020 he holds a professorship at Queen's University at Kingston.

Academic career
Smallwood has been a pioneer in the development of experience sampling methods and their integration with cognitive neuroscience methodologies, for example in the study of mind-wandering.

Work
Smallwood proposes the decoupling hypothesis, referring to the observation that individuals report having no memory of what happened in the surrounding environment while preoccupied with their thoughts. In 2006, the publication of "The Restless Mind" discussed a psychological framework for controversies characterizing cognitive neuroscience research into mind-wandering through the end of the decade.

See also
Default mode network
Resting state fMRI

References

External links
Google Scholar page for Jonathan Smallwood

1975 births
Academics of the University of York
Alumni of the University of Strathclyde
British psychologists
Scottish psychologists
People from Wolverhampton
Living people